José Antonio Romualdo Pacheco (October 31, 1831January 23, 1899) was a Californio statesman and diplomat. A Republican, he is best known as the only Hispanic person to serve as Governor of California since the American Conquest of California, and as the first Latino to represent a state in the U.S. Congress. Pacheco was elected and appointed to various state, federal, and diplomatic offices throughout his more than thirty-year career, including serving as a California State Treasurer, California State Senator, and three terms in the U.S. House of Representatives.

Early life
José Antonio Romualdo Pacheco was a Californio, born in Santa Barbara, California, to a family with prominent connections. His father, José Antonio Romualdo Pacheco, had moved to Alta California from Guanajuato in 1825, and served as an aide to José María de Echeandía during his tenure as Governor of Alta California. Pacheco's father was killed at the Battle of Cahuenga Pass in 1831, when the young Romualdo was just five weeks old.  His father had shot José María Avila, who had attacked Alta California Governor Manuel Victoria with a lance, but died when Avila's lance struck him.  

His mother, María Ramona Carrillo de Pacheco, was a sister-in-law of General Mariano Guadalupe Vallejo and a daughter of María Ygnacia López de Carrillo, the grantee of Rancho Cabeza de Santa Rosa. After the death of his father, Romualdo's mother married Captain John D. Wilson, a Scotsman, who sent Pacheco to Honolulu, Hawaii, for his education.

At age twelve, Pacheco began an apprenticeship aboard a trading vessel. The Mexican–American War broke out two years later, and he was briefly held by American forces during the Conquest of California while on one trip in July 1846, as he brought cargo to Yerba Buena (modern day San Francisco). The ship he was on was searched, and he made an oath of allegiance to the United States and was released.

Politics

Pacheco's association with a prominent family in the state helped him to gain support as he entered politics in the 1850s. He was also well respected by Anglos coming into the area. Early in his political career in the 1850s, he was a Democrat. He became affiliated with the National Union Party in the 1860s, but was elected to most of his positions as a candidate for the Republican Party.

In 1853, at age 22, Pacheco successfully sought the position of judge in San Luis Obispo County. Pacheco was elected to the state senate in 1857, succeeded his cousin Pablo de la Guerra.  He was re-elected two times, serving until 1863. During the American Civil War Pacheco was appointed the rank of brigadier general by Governor Leland Stanford and directed to disarm military companies in the Los Angeles area that were not loyal to the Union.

Pacheco served as state treasurer from 1863 to 1867, then returned to the State Senate until becoming lieutenant governor. He served as Lieutenant Governor of California under Newton Booth until Booth was elected to the United States Senate in 1875. Pacheco then served as governor from February 27 to December 9, 1875, when Lieutenant Governor William Irwin, winner in the September elections that year, was inaugurated.

After briefly serving as governor, Pacheco ran for a U.S. House seat, defeating incumbent Peter D. Wigginton by just one vote. Wigginton contested the election, eventually forcing Pacheco to leave in 1878 when the House Committee on Elections refused Pacheco's certificate of election. Returning to California, he went into business until winning a House seat again in September 1879. He was reelected in 1880.

Diplomacy and death

After leaving Congress, Pacheco lived on a cattle ranch in the northern Mexican state of Coahuila for five years until he was appointed as U.S. Minister to various countries in Central America in 1890.

He returned to California in 1893, and died in Oakland at the home of his brother-in-law in 1899. He is buried in at Mountain View Cemetery.

Personal life
On October 31, 1863, he married Mary McIntire, a 22-year-old playwright.  They had three children, Maybella Ramona, Romualdo, and Enrique.

Legacy
Pacheco served not only as the first Hispanic to hold the office of Governor of California, but the only one to do so in California's history as a state. He is also remembered for being the first Hispanic to represent a state in the U.S. Congress. Hispanics had served as non-voting delegates of territories before, but Pacheco was the first full-voting Hispanic member of congress.

He was the last Hispanic Republican to represent California in the U.S. House of Representatives until Mike Garcia was elected to represent the 25th district in a special election in May 2020.

See also
 List of governors of California
 Hispanic and Latino conservatism in the United States
 List of Hispanic and Latino Americans in the United States Congress
 List of minority governors and lieutenant governors in the United States

References

Further reading
 
Ronald Genini & Richard Hitchman, Romualdo Pacheco: A Californio in Two Eras, The Book Club of California:1985. LC Control#86101529

External links 

Romualdo Pacheco at the California State Library
Romualdo Pacheco at the Biographical Directory of the United States Congress
Romualdo Pacheco at the Library of Congress

|-

|-

|-

|-

|-

|-

|-

|-

|-

|-

1831 births
1899 deaths
19th-century American diplomats
19th-century American politicians
Ambassadors of the United States to Costa Rica
Ambassadors of the United States to El Salvador
Ambassadors of the United States to Guatemala
Ambassadors of the United States to Honduras
Ambassadors of the United States to Nicaragua
American people of Spanish descent
American politicians of Mexican descent
Burials at Mountain View Cemetery (Oakland, California)
Republican Party California state senators
Californios
Republican Party governors of California
Hispanic and Latino American diplomats
Hispanic and Latino American members of the United States Congress
Hispanic and Latino American state governors of the United States
Hispanic and Latino American state legislators in California
Lieutenant Governors of California
Republican Party members of the California State Assembly
People from Santa Barbara, California
Republican Party members of the United States House of Representatives from California
State treasurers of California
Latino conservatism in the United States
California
Mexican
Mexican-American culture in California